"The Longer We Make Love" is a song recorded by American singer Barry White for his 1999 album, Staying Power. It was written by White, Aaron Schroeder and Marlon Saunders, and produced by White and Jack Perry. The song was recorded in two versions: as a duet with Lisa Stansfield and as another duet with Chaka Khan. Both are written and recorded in the key of G minor. The song received positive reviews from music critics. The CD single was released in selected European countries on July 19, 1999. "The Longer We Make Love" was also issued as a promotional single in the United States. The song reached #17 on the US Adult R&B charts in early 2000.

Track listings
European CD single
"The Longer We Make Love" (Duet with Lisa Stansfield) (Radio Edit) – 3:57 
"The Longer We Make Love" (Duet with Lisa Stansfield) (Album Version) – 6:26
"The Longer We Make Love" (Duet with Chaka Khan) (Radio Edit) – 3:59

US promotional CD single
"The Longer We Make Love" (Duet with Lisa Stansfield) (Radio Edit) – 3:55 
"The Longer We Make Love" (Duet with Chaka Khan) (Radio Edit) – 3:48
"The Longer We Make Love" (Duet with Lisa Stansfield) (Album Version) – 6:24
"The Longer We Make Love" (Duet with Chaka Khan) (Album Version) – 5:46

Charts

References

Barry White songs
Lisa Stansfield songs
Chaka Khan songs
1999 singles
Songs written by Barry White
Songs written by Aaron Schroeder
1999 songs
Contemporary R&B ballads
Soul ballads
Male–female vocal duets